The chestnut-vented warbler, chestnut-vented tit-babbler or rufous-vented warbler (Curruca subcoerulea) is an Old World warbler.

The chestnut-vented warbler breeds in southern Africa in Angola, Botswana, Zimbabwe, Zambia, Namibia, South Africa, Lesotho, Mozambique and Eswatini. This is a common species found in a range of habitats including fynbos, scrub, thickets and dry riverbeds.

Taxonomy
The first formal description of the chestnut-vented warbler was by the French naturalist Louis Jean Pierre Vieillot in 1817. He introduced the binomial name Sylvia subcœrulea using the œ ligature. The specific epithet would normally be spelled subcaerulea or  subcærulea and comes from the Latin sub meaning somewhat or beneath and caeruleus for blue. In modern Latin subcaeruleus  is used to indicate pale blue. Most authorities use the standard spelling subcaerulea but some use the original spelling subcoerulea.

Description

The chestnut-vented warbler is 14–15 cm long and weighs around 16 g. Its upperparts are grey-brown, and the tail is black with a broad white band at its tip. This warbler has a white eye ring. The throat is grey with heavy dark streaking, the breast and belly are grey, and the vent area is bright chestnut. The legs are black and the eyes are grey. The sexes are similar, but the juvenile has an unstreaked throat. The call is a loud fluted cheerup-chee-chee.

Layard's warbler, Curruca layardi, is the only similar species, but is paler, has more white in the tail, and lacks the chestnut vent.

Behaviour

The chestnut-vented warbler builds a cup nest low in vegetation.  This species is monogamous, pairing for life. It is usually seen alone or in pairs, moving through vegetation as it forages for insects and other small invertebrates.

Conservation status
This common species has a large range, with an estimated extent of 2,800,000 km2. The population size is believed to be large, and the species is not believed to approach the thresholds for the population decline criterion of the IUCN Red List (i.e. declining more than 30% in ten years or three generations). For these reasons, the species is evaluated as Least Concern.

References

 Ian Sinclair, Phil Hockey and Warwick Tarboton, SASOL Birds of Southern Africa (Struik 2002)

External links
 Chestnut-vented warbler/Titbabbler - Species text in The Atlas of Southern African Birds.

chestnut-vented warbler
Birds of Southern Africa
chestnut-vented warbler
Taxa named by Louis Jean Pierre Vieillot